The Men's downhill competition at the 2015 World Championships was held on Saturday, February 7.

Switzerland's Patrick Küng won the gold medal, Travis Ganong of the United States took the silver, and the bronze medalist was Beat Feuz of Switzerland.

Results
The race was started at 11:00 MST (UTC-7).

References

Men's downhill
2015